The 1926 Rice Owls football team was an American football team that represented Rice University as a member of the Southwest Conference (SWC) during the 1926 college football season. In its third season under head coach John Heisman, the team compiled a 4–4–1 record (0–4 against SWC opponents) and outscored opponents by a total of 84 to 81.

Schedule

References

Rice
Rice Owls football seasons
Rice Owls football